The 1917 Rutgers Queensmen football team was an American football team that represented Rutgers University as an independent during the 1917 college football season. In their fifth season under head coach George Sanford, the Queensmen compiled a 7–1–1 record and outscored their opponents, 295 to 28. The sole loss was to Syracuse by a 14–10 score. The tie was a 7–7 game with West Virginia. Paul Robeson played at the end position for the 1917 and 1918 Rutgers teams, was selected by Frank G. Menke as a first-team All-American in both 1917 and 1918, and was inducted into the College Football Hall of Fame in 1995. Coach Sanford was inducted into the College Football Hall of Fame in 1971.

Schedule

References

Rutgers
Rutgers Scarlet Knights football seasons
Rutgers Queensmen football